The 2020 United States House of Representatives elections in Colorado was held on November 3, 2020, to elect the seven U.S. representatives from the state of Colorado, one from each of the state's seven congressional districts. The elections coincided with the 2020 U.S. presidential election, as well as other elections to the House of Representatives, elections to the United States Senate and various state and local elections.

Overview
Results of the 2020 United States House of Representatives elections in Colorado by district:

District 1

The 1st district includes all of Denver, as well as the neighboring suburbs of Glendale, Englewood, Sheridan, and Cherry Hills Village. The incumbent is Democrat Diana DeGette, who was re-elected with 73.8% of the vote in 2018.

Democratic primary

Candidates

Declared
Diana DeGette, incumbent U.S. Representative

Did not qualify
 Meghan Pratschler, former candidate for Ohio's 1st congressional district in 2020 
 Gabrielle Watson
 Charlie Madison Winters, activist

Withdrawn
Crisanta Duran, former speaker of the Colorado House of Representatives

Declined
Candi CdeBaca, Denver city councilwoman

Endorsements

Primary results

Republican primary

Candidates

Declared
 Shane Bolling

Primary results

General election

Predictions

Results

District 2

The 2nd district is located in north-central Colorado, taking in Boulder, Fort Collins, Loveland, as well as the surrounding mountain ski towns, including Vail, Grand Lake and Idaho Springs. The incumbent is Democrat Joe Neguse, who was elected with 60.3% of the vote in 2018.

Democratic primary

Candidates

Declared
Joe Neguse, incumbent U.S. Representative

Endorsements

Primary results

Republican primary

Candidates

Declared
Charles Winn, former U.S. Navy flight surgeon

Primary results

General election

Predictions

Results

District 3

The 3rd district encompasses the Colorado Western Slope, including the cities of Aspen, Pueblo, and Grand Junction. The incumbent is Republican Scott Tipton, who was re-elected with 51.5% of the vote in 2018. According to The Cook Political Report, the 3rd district has a Partisan Voting Index of R+6.

Republican primary

Candidates

Nominee
Lauren Boebert, restaurant owner and pro-gun activist

Eliminated in primary
Scott Tipton, incumbent U.S. Representative

Endorsements

Primary results
On June 30, 2020, Lauren Boebert defeated Scott Tipton by a 54.6% to 45.4% margin to win the nomination. During her campaign, Boebert criticized Alexandria Ocasio-Cortez and other members of "The Squad", positioning herself as a conservative alternative to Ocasio-Cortez.
Dick Wadhams, a Republican political consultant from Denver, says that Tipton had several hundred thousand dollars in the bank for his primary against Boebert, but he chose not to use it for TV/radio ads, mailings, or social media, ceding the debate to Boebert, who inspired a much higher Republican turnout than in 2018.

Democratic primary

Candidates

Nominee
Diane Mitsch Bush, former state representative and nominee for Colorado's 3rd congressional district in 2018

Eliminated in primary
James Iacino, CEO of Seattle Fish Co.

Withdrawn
Donald Valdez, state representative
Root Routledge, U.S. Air Force veteran

Declined
Leroy Garcia, president of the Colorado Senate

Endorsements

Primary results

Others

Libertarian Party nominee
John Ryan Keil, businessman

Unity Party nominee
Critter Milton, financial advisor

Independent (withdrawn)
Robert Moser, publisher and former sales executive

General election

Predictions

Endorsements

Polling

Results
Boebert defeated Bush by six percent on November 3, 2020, 51.39% to 45.22%.  Boebert raised $2.4 million and Bush raised $4.2 million.  Republican groups spent more than $5 million. Democratic groups spent nearly $4 million.

District 4

The 4th district encompasses rural eastern Colorado, the Front Range cities of Greeley and Longmont, as well as the southern Denver exurbs, including Castle Rock and Parker. The incumbent is Republican Ken Buck, who was re-elected with 60.6% of the vote in 2018.

Republican primary

Candidates

Declared
Ken Buck, incumbent U.S. Representative

Primary results

Democratic primary

Candidates

Declared
Issac "Ike" McCorkle, former U.S. Marine Corps officer

Primary results

General election

Predictions

Results

District 5

The 5th district is based in Colorado Springs and its suburbs. The incumbent is Republican Doug Lamborn, who was re-elected with 57.0% of the vote in 2018.

Republican primary

Candidates

Declared
Doug Lamborn, incumbent U.S. Representative

Primary results

Democratic primary

Candidates

Declared
Jillian Freeland, businesswoman

Withdrawn
Brandon Bocchino, entrepreneur
George English, U.S. Army veteran
Ryan Lucas, health care worker
Mario Sanchez

Endorsements

Primary results

Others

Unity
Rebecca Keltie, U.S. navy veteran

General election

Predictions

Endorsements

Results

District 6

The 6th district is based in the southern suburbs of the Denver-Aurora metropolitan area including, Aurora, Brighton, Centennial, and Highlands Ranch. The incumbent is Democrat Jason Crow, who flipped the district and was elected with 54.1% of the vote in 2018.

Democratic primary

Candidates

Declared
Jason Crow, incumbent U.S. Representative

Endorsements

Primary results

Republican primary

Candidates

Declared
Steve House, former chairman of the Colorado Republican Party

Declined
Mike Coffman, former U.S. Representative and mayor of Aurora

Withdrawn
Casper Stockham, U.S. Air Force veteran, motivational speaker, and nominee for Colorado's 1st congressional district in 2016 and 2018 (Ran for CO-07)

Endorsements

Primary results

General election

Predictions

Results

District 7

The 7th district encompasses the northern and western suburbs of Denver including, Arvada, Lakewood, Golden, Thornton, and Westminster. The incumbent is Democrat Ed Perlmutter, who was re-elected with 60.4% of the vote in 2018.

Democratic primary

Candidates

Declared
Ed Perlmutter, incumbent U.S. Representative

Endorsements

Primary results

Republican primary

Candidates

Declared
Casper Stockham, U.S. Air Force veteran, motivational speaker, and nominee for Colorado's 1st congressional district in 2016 and 2018

Primary results

General election

Predictions

Results

Notes

Partisan clients

References

External links
 Colorado Secretary of State

Official campaign websites for 1st district candidates
 Shane Bolling (R) for Congress 
 Diana DeGette (D) for Congress

Official campaign websites for 2nd district candidates
 Alex Johnson (I) for Congress
 Joe Neguse (D) for Congress
 Charlie Winn (R) for Congress

Official campaign websites for 3rd district candidates
 Lauren Boebert (R) for Congress
 Diane Mitsch Bush (D) for Congress 

Official campaign websites for 4th district candidates
 Ken Buck (R) for Congress
 Issac "Ike" McCorkle (D) for Congress

Official campaign websites for 5th district candidates
 Jillian Freeland (D) for Congress 
 Rebecca Keltie (U) for Congress 
 Doug Lamborn (R) for Congress

Official campaign websites for 6th district candidates
 Jason Crow (D) for Congress
 Steve House (R) for Congress 

Official campaign websites for 7th district candidates
 Ed Perlmutter (D) for Congress
 Casper Stockham (R) for Congress

Colorado
2020
House